Las Margaritas is a corregimiento in Chepo District, Panamá Province, Panama with a population of 4,991 as of 2010. Its population as of 1990 was 3,852; its population as of 2000 was 4,500.

References

Corregimientos of Panamá Province